Okinawa Autotech is an Indian company that produces electric scooters. The company was founded by Jeetender Sharma and Dr Rupali Sharma, and has its headquarters in Gurgaon.

History 

The company was formed in 2015 by husband and wife Jeetender Sharma and Dr Rupali Sharma at a factory in Bhiwadi, Rajasthan. Two years later, the company released its first product, the Ridge electric scooter. In May 2019, the i-Praise and Ridge+ models became eligible for the Indian government FAME-II subsidy. Also in 2019, the company released the Praise Pro and Lite scooters. The R30 scooter was released in 2020, 

The Dual B2B scooter was released in 2021. Also in 2021, Okinawa received International Automotive Task Force Certification. 

In February 2022, an additional factory was opened in Bhiwadi, Rajasthan. In March 2022, the company released the OKHI-90 electric scooter. In June 2022, Okinawa began construction of a new factory in Karoli, Rajasthan.

References 

Electric scooters
Motor scooters
Electric vehicle manufacturers of India
Electric vehicle industry
Battery electric vehicle manufacturers
Manufacturing companies based in Gurgaon
Vehicle manufacturing companies established in 2015
Scooter manufacturers